Catharina Belgica of Nassau (31 July 1578 – 12 April 1648) was a countess of Hanau-Münzenberg by marriage to Philip Louis II, Count of Hanau-Münzenberg. She was regent of Hanau-Münzenberg during the minority of her son from 1612 until 1626.

Biography

Early life
She was the third daughter of William the Silent and his third spouse Charlotte of Bourbon.

Catharina Belgica was born in Antwerp. After her father had been assassinated in 1584, her aunt Catherine took her to Arnstadt, while most of her sisters were raised by Louise de Coligny. Her older sister Juliana would later criticize Catharina's Lutheran education.

In 1596 she married Philip Louis II, Count of Hanau-Münzenberg with whom she had ten children.

Regent
When her husband died in 1612, Catharina Belgica became regent for her son Philip Maurice. When emperor Ferdinand II requested passage through Hanau for his coronation in Frankfurt in 1618, she refused him entry. Her territories were ravaged by imperial troops in 1621, and she and her children had to evacuate to The Hague. 

In 1626, her son took over government. When king Gustavus Adolphus of Sweden liberated Hanau from Imperial occupation in 1631, it was Catharina Belgica who issued negotiations with the Swedish king and successfully secured the state for her son, and she guarded the alliance between Sweden and Hanau in cooperation with her daughter, the regent of Hesse-Cassel. 

She died, aged 69, in The Hague.

Family
During a wedding feast in Dillenburg that lasted from 23 October 1596 - 3 November 1596, she married Philip Louis II of Hanau-Münzenberg, producing the following children:
Charlotte Louise (1597–1649 Kassel), not married
Daughter (29 July 1598 – 9 August 1598), died unbaptised
Philip Ulrich (2 January 1601 – 7 April 1604 Steinau)
Amalia Elisabeth (1602–1651 Kassel), married to William V, Landgrave of Hesse-Kassel
Katharina Juliane (1604–1668 Hanau), married first on 11 September 1631 to Count Albert Otto II of Solms-Laubach, Rödelheim and Assenheim  and second on 31 March 1642 to Moritz Christian von Wied-Runkel
Philip Maurice (1605–1638), buried in the Marienkirche in Hanau
Wilhelm Reinhard (1607–1630 Aachen), buried in the Marienkirche in Hanau
Henry Louis (1609–1632) died during the Siege of Maastricht
Frederick Louis (27 July 1610 – 4 October 1628 Paris), buried in the family tomb of the Duke of Bouillon in Sedan
Jakob Johann (1612–1636 Zabern), buried in St. Nicholas in Strasbourg

Ancestry

References

Sources
Catharina Belgica: biography on Worldroots

17th-century women rulers
1578 births
1648 deaths
House of Orange-Nassau
Burials in the Royal Crypt at Nieuwe Kerk, Delft
Countesses of Hanau-Münzenberg
Countesses of Nassau
People of the Thirty Years' War
Daughters of monarchs